Lê Quốc Phương (born 19 May 1991) is a Vietnamese association football player who is playing for V.League 1 club Thanh Hóa.

International career

International goals

Under-19

Under-22

Honours

Club
Đông Á Thanh Hóa
Vietnamese National Cup:
 Third place : 2022

References 

1991 births
Living people
Vietnamese footballers
Association football wingers
Thanh Hóa FC players
V.League 1 players
People from Thanh Hóa province